Pramod Dabir (born October 5, 1984) is an American former tennis player.

Dabir was ranked as high as fourth in the country for the 16s age group and had the top ranking in Northern California for the 18s, while growing up in Monta Vista. 

The son of engineers, Dabir studied electrical engineering at the University of Illinois and was a member of the 2003 NCAA Division I Championship team.

After teaming up with John Isner to win a national doubles title at the 2003 USTA Boys 18s Championships in Kalamazoo, the pair competed as wildcards in the men's doubles main draw of that year's US Open.

Opting against turning professional, Dabir went into the business world after college and founded software company West Agile Labs. The company is based in San Francisco and he is the current CEO.

References

External links
 
 

1984 births
Living people
American male tennis players
Tennis people from California
Illinois Fighting Illini men's tennis players